Ice hockey at the 2016 Winter Youth Olympics was held at Kristins Hall in Lillehammer, Norway from 12 to 21 February. The difference between the Youth Olympic program for ice hockey and the Winter Olympics was the addition of a skill challenge for each gender.

Medal summary

Medal table

Events

Qualification system
There were ten teams in total (five per gender), with 17 players on each team. Participating nations were able to select whether they wished to participate in either the men's or women's ice hockey tournament according to the running order based on a joint under-18 world ranking established after the Men's and Women's U18 World Championships in 2015. Norway, as the host nation, was allowed to participate with one team of each gender.

For the skills challenge, the host nation was allowed to send one competitor of each gender. For the remaining competitors, national competitions were held, and the qualifiers attended a Global Skills Challenge at the 2015 Hockey Development Camp in Vierumäki, Finland.

Boys

 (hosts)

Girls

 (hosts)

Skills challenge
The following athletes have qualified:

References

External links
Results Book – Ice hockey

 
2016
Youth Olympics
2016 Winter Youth Olympics events
2016
Youth Olympics